Insurgency: Sandstorm is a multiplayer tactical first-person shooter video game developed by New World Interactive and published by Focus Home Interactive. The game is a sequel to the 2014 video game Insurgency. Set in an unnamed fictional Middle Eastern region, the game depicts a conflict between two factions: "Security", loosely based on various world militaries (namely NATO forces; United States SOCOM; the armed forces of Iraq, Afghanistan, and Syria; Kurdish YPG and YPJ; and Western private military companies); and "Insurgents", loosely based on various paramilitary and terrorist groups (namely ISIL, the Taliban, Al-Qaeda, Security defectors, and implied Russian mercenaries).

Insurgency: Sandstorm was officially announced in February 2016 for Microsoft Windows. It was released on December 12, 2018, for Windows; the previously announced Linux and macOS versions of the game were cancelled. The PlayStation 4 and Xbox One versions went through numerous delays and were released alongside PlayStation 5 and Xbox Series X/S versions on September 29, 2021.

Insurgency: Sandstorm received critical acclaim for its realistic gameplay, level design, sound design, atmosphere, graphics, and fluid animations, but was criticized for its technical issues and optimization, with some lamenting the cancellation of the planned story campaign.

Gameplay 

Similar to Insurgency and Day of Infamy, Insurgency: Sandstorm features a minimal HUD, lacking a health bar, ammunition count, or minimap. The Insurgency series has tactical, realistic gameplay, with moments of intensity. Weapons are accurate and can kill in very few shots, placing emphasis on using teamwork and cooperation to survive. Like its predecessors, most game modes in Sandstorm do not feature instant respawns; instead, dead players must spectate and wait for their team to complete an objective in order to respawn. Improvements from Insurgency include updated visuals, character customization, cosmetics, weapon skins, a player progression system, larger maps, and drivable technicals.

Players are separated into two teams: Security and Insurgents. Security primarily uses weaponry originating from NATO and Western countries, such as the M4A1, G36K, L85A2, AUG, and MP7, while Insurgents use a diverse mixture of weaponry, ranging from Russian and Chinese weapons such as the AK-74, TOZ-194, QBZ-97, and PKM, to older Western weapons including the M16A2 and P90, to outdated World War II-era weapons like the Welrod and M1 Garand.

Players can choose from eight classes with varying armaments: Rifleman, Breacher, Advisor, Demolitions, Marksman, Gunner, Observer, and Commander. Players have limited "supply points" (SP) to spend on weapons, attachments, and equipment, but must also manage their weight, which increases with the amount or type of weapons and equipment currently equipped; higher weight reduces the player's stamina and movement speed. Players can use SP to modify their weapons with a variety of attachments, such as weapon sights, laser sights, foregrips, bipods, muzzle attachments, and suppressors, with additional attachments available for specific weapons and classes, such as underbarrel explosive grenade launchers for Demolitions. Gas masks, night-vision goggles, rocket launchers, plastic explosives, and various types of grenades are available as equipment costing SP. Players may also change their armor and carrier, which affect their survivability and carried munitions respectively.

Returning from Day of Infamy is the fire support system, which may be requested by a Commander if a friendly Observer is within 10 meters of them. Security can call for close air support, such as an A-10 strafe, or for an AH-64 Apache or UH-60 Black Hawk to fly over and attack visible enemies, though both of these helicopters can be shot down by enemy rocket launchers or anti-materiel rifles. Insurgents can call for an improvised drone strike, rocket artillery, an IED drone, or a chemical gas strike that kills anyone in its radius without a gas mask on. Both teams also have access to explosive and smoke artillery (mortars for Insurgents); Security fires few rounds with greater precision, while Insurgents fire more rounds with less precision.

Game modes

Versus 
 Push: The attackers must capture three or four objectives in sequential order. For every objective captured, more reinforcements are made available and more time is given to capture the next objective. The defenders must protect the objectives from the attackers. If the attackers are able to capture all objectives, they must find and destroy the defenders' cache; at this point, the defenders only have one life to fend off the attackers. The match ends if either team runs out of reinforcements, players, or time, or if the attackers destroy the cache.
 Firefight: Both teams must sequentially capture all three objectives. Dead players can only respawn if their team has captured an objective. The match ends if the enemy team is eliminated or all three objectives are captured.
 Frontline: Both teams must capture objectives one by one and then destroy the enemy cache, similar to Push. Players must capture enemy objectives while also defending their own. Dead players can only respawn if their team has captured an objective. The match ends if the enemy team is eliminated or the enemy cache is destroyed.
 Domination: Similar to Firefight, there are three objectives which must be captured; however, they may be captured in any order at any time. Upon death, players immediately respawn in a random location on the map. Teams earn points for each objective held, and the team that reaches the point threshold wins.
Ambush: The defenders must protect a designated VIP player and escort them to an extraction point, while the attackers must kill the VIP. The VIP is only armed with a handgun and cannot respawn. Attackers win if the VIP player is killed, while defenders win if the VIP player reaches the extraction point.
Defuse: The defenders must protect a pair of caches from the attackers, who must destroy the caches. If one cache is destroyed, the defenders must fall back to protect the remaining cache. Defuse is played over two rounds; defenders earn points for each cache that survives by the end of the round, while attackers earn points for each cache destroyed. The team that has the most points by the end of the match wins.

Co-op 
 Checkpoint: Players must sequentially capture objectives or destroy caches while fighting computer-controlled enemies as they advance across the map, similar to Push. After capturing some enemy objectives, the enemy may initiate a counterattack, during which surviving players must defend the point against a wave of enemies; a longer counterattack will always occur on the final objective. All dead players respawn when an objective is captured. Players win if all objectives are captured and the final counterattack is repelled.
Hardcore Checkpoint: Checkpoint with slower movement, limited equipment and SP, and no friendly player HUD icons. Upon death, players respawn with a limited loadout consisting of their team's bolt-action rifle and cheapest sidearm, and they can only reequip their selected loadout through a supply box placed randomly in the map.
 Outpost: Players must defend an objective from seven waves of enemies, similar to the counterattacks from Checkpoint. Every two waves is a special enemy wave, consisting of special enemies such as suicide bombers and armored enemies with machine guns. Players only have two SP at the beginning of each match, with two more earned with each wave completed. If an objective is lost, players are pushed back to a different objective; if all objectives are lost, the match is lost. Players win if all seven waves are repelled. All players are placed on Security in this mode.
Survival: Players must capture a series of random objectives across a map while fighting enemies. Players are given limited SP and can only equip sidearms in the loadout menu; other weapons must be acquired from fallen enemies or from weapon cases at each captured objective that generate a random primary weapon when opened. Like Checkpoint, the final objective always has a long enemy counterattack that must be repelled to allow a helicopter to extract the players. Players win if all objectives are captured and the final counterattack is repelled. All players are placed on Security in this mode.

Removed game modes 
 Skirmish: Like Firefight, there are three objectives that both teams must capture. Each team also has a cache to protect. If the caches of both teams are destroyed, the game will be played like Firefight. To win, the enemy cache must be destroyed and all three objectives must be captured. Removed in update 1.4.1 due to low popularity, to decrease queue times, and to allow the developers to maintain other game modes.
Frenzy: Checkpoint with almost all enemies using knives instead of firearms. Special enemies include armored enemies that take several shots to kill, teleporting enemies that dodge attacks, and burning enemies that drop a lit Molotov cocktail on death. All players are placed on Security in this mode. Replaced by Outpost in update 1.8 due to low popularity, and converted into a Limited Time Playlist.
Arcade: Casual modes that were rotated out with updates, such as Team Deathmatch. Replaced by Limited Time Playlists in update 1.4.
Competitive: Firefight in a five-versus-five ranked queue, with higher equipment costs and a different class structure. Removed in update 1.9.1 due to low popularity.

Limited Time Playlists 
Sandstorm features "Limited Time Playlists", temporary casual modes that are generally existing modes with gameplay-changing modifications. These may be significant changes, such as "Team Deathmatch" (both teams fight to gain a certain amount of kills with wider loadouts and instant respawns), "Hot Potato" (live fragmentation grenades are dropped upon death), "Task Force 666" (Frenzy on night maps only; players heal by killing enemies), "Running in the 90s" (Checkpoint with sights disabled and weapons always pointing forward, mimicking classic shooters such as Counter-Strike and Unreal Tournament). However, most are weapon-limiting modes such as "Gang War" (Push with handguns only) and "Budget Antiquing" (Checkpoint with weapons limited to a selection of older firearms). These modes are also available for custom servers.

Development 
Insurgency: Sandstorm was first announced on February 23, 2016, on New World Interactive's website. The game was confirmed to be on Unreal Engine 4, instead of Source like Insurgency and Day of Infamy. The fire support system from Day of Infamy was confirmed to return. Drivable vehicles were also confirmed, a first for the series.

Lead designer Michael Tsarouhas aimed to "find a balance" between military simulator games such as ArmA and Squad, and action games such as Call of Duty, to provide both action and realism in gameplay.

Early in development, Sandstorm had a planned single-player and cooperative story campaign, described as focusing on "a squad of characters as they face increasingly challenging chapters, from the invasion of Iraq in 2003 through the insurrection period and leading to the present day." A trailer for the campaign was shown at E3 2017. The campaign was later canceled in January 2018, with lead designer Michael Tsarouhas explaining in an announcement that it was canceled due to "high production requirements and our commitment to deliver to our fans in 2018", noting that the initial plan to set the game in an actual world conflict was restricting and "admittedly, sensitive", and that the conflict depicted in-game was fictional but drew inspiration from real conflicts. The announcement also stated that the campaign would be "considered again at a later date"; however, no news related to the campaign has been released since.

Release 
Insurgency: Sandstorm was released for Windows on December 12, 2018, through Steam. Linux and macOS releases were planned, but they were both cancelled in December 2019. Though PlayStation 4 and Xbox One releases of Sandstorm were announced and intended to be released with the Windows version, their release was repeatedly delayed due to development issues, first to 2019, then early 2020, then August 2020. The PlayStation 4, Xbox One, PlayStation 5, and Xbox Series X/S versions were eventually released on September 29, 2021.

Since its release, the game has had several updates adding new maps, game modes, cosmetic items, weapons, and equipment, including returning content from Insurgency and Day of Infamy. Since the June 2020 release of update 1.7, "Operation: Nightfall", major content updates have been called "Operations", similar to other tactical shooters such as Tom Clancy's Rainbow Six Siege. "Operation: Nightfall" included paid cosmetic items and weapon skins as optional downloadable content, a first for the Insurgency series. Update 1.9, "Operation: Cold Blood", was developed from home during the COVID-19 pandemic and was released in December 2020. The game is currently on update 1.13, "Operation: Livewire", released on November 17, 2022, which added new machine guns and cosmetic sets.

Reception

Insurgency: Sandstorm received acclaim from critics for its realistic gameplay and atmospheric sound design. VG247 rated Sandstorm as "one of the best multiplayer games of the year". Sandstorm received an 88/100 from IGN, writing "[it] nails the balance between realism and fun", though it criticized unclear map boundaries. PCGamer rated the game 85/100, calling it "terrifying", and further expressing "I’ll never forget the screaming". It received "generally favorable" reviews according to review aggregator Metacritic.

Sandstorm'''s optimization received some criticism, with Worth Playing writing "In the heat of an intense battle, your processor will also put out some heat." A more critical review came from PCGamesN, who felt the game was "behind the times in both theme and looks" with "nameless locations with nameless conflicts", lamenting the removal of the planned story campaign, which would have featured "two Iraqi women crossing a war-torn land"—"It’s a shame to miss out on a potentially refreshing perspective."

 Controversies 
Update 1.9, "Operation: Cold Blood", included a major overhaul of the co-op mode weapon availability which, prior to the change, allowed each faction to use the opposing faction's weapons; update 1.9 removed this, standardizing the weapon loadouts with the Versus modes. The community response to this change was very negative, leading New World Interactive to undo the change and release an apology on Steam.

Update 1.9.1, "Lunar New Year Update", included two Chinese rifles (QBZ-97 and QTS-11) and Chinese-themed DLC cosmetic sets for Security and Insurgents, the latter being a bright red changshan. The planned cosmetics were harshly criticized by the community, as they were deemed to be too unrealistic and clashed with the established artstyle and setting, with many negatively comparing their appearances to character skins in Fortnite''. Following the backlash, New World Interactive apologized and announced they would not release the cosmetics; update 1.9.1 released on February 2, 2021, without them.

References

2018 video games
First-person shooter multiplayer online games
Tactical shooter video games
Focus Entertainment games
Unreal Engine games
Video game sequels
Video games developed in the United States
Video games set in the Middle East
Multiplayer online games
Windows games
PlayStation 4 games
PlayStation 5 games
Xbox One games
Xbox Series X and Series S games